The Synagogue of Kłodzko was located in  Kłodzko (former German name: Glatz), in Kłodzko County in Lower Silesia,  Poland. The synagogue was built 1884–1885 on the Grünestraße (Green Street), now Wojska Polskiego Street, but was destroyed in 1938 during the Nazi Kristallnacht anti-Jewish pogrom.

History 
The synagogue was built on the initiative of the Progressive Jews, according to the plans of architect Albert Grau (1837–1900) of Breslau (now Wrocław), a student of Georg Gottlob Ungewitter, in the style of the Neo-Moorish and Brick-neo-Gothic.

From 1742 Kłodzko was part of the Kingdom of Prussia, then Germany, until Silesia became Polish under border changes promulgated at the 1945 Potsdam Conference. During the November Pogrom (9 November 1938), termed "Kristallnacht" in German Nazi propaganda, the synagogue was destroyed in an arson attack by German Nazi gangs.

Memory 
Reinhard Schindler, a former Glatz citizen, developed the idea of having a memorial stone placed for the synagogue. The memorial stone was erected in 1995 with an anodised aluminum plaque in Polish, Hebrew and German commemorating the destroyed synagogue. The inscription reads:

Here stood the Glatz synagogue, desecrated and burned by the Nazis in the Pogrom Night of November 9, 1938. Former German and current Polish citizens in 1995 – 50 years after the end of the war.

Sculpture 

In the years 2015–2016, the German sculptor  of Darmstadt created a sculpture of the synagogue made of cast aluminium weighing approx. . The collected materials, plans and sketches, together with photos and a description of the burning of the temple, was published as a book by Roese under the title: Decalogue on Fire. The artistic work under the same title includes the sculpture of the synagogue, a sculpture of the Ten Commandments above the portal, and a sculpture of one of the cast-iron gallery columns that collapsed during the fire in its rubble and ash bed. In addition, fifteen 1 × 1 meter (3.3 × 3.3 foot) large panels of photographs by Günter Veit and a synagogue with a fragment of a Torah scroll, probably stolen in Poland by a member of the Wehrmacht. In May 2018, Roese brought the entire work to Kłodzko with the help of a group of young people and donated it to the city. The sculpture and other materials from the exhibition of Roese were also in 2018 in the project Topography of Terror installed in Berlin and published in a catalog.

Synagogue Revival 

Gerhard Roese talked about his idea and implementation of the sculpture model of the synagogue.

Students from various schools in Kłodzko and a group of adults participated. They learned what is known about the structure and its destruction today, as well as that of two surviving ladies, Ruth Prager and Shoshana Efrati, who had visited the synagogue in their childhood. Henryk Grzybowski told about their fate from former Glatz, to Chile and Israel.

After a small concert with Yiddish and Hebrew songs performed by Sylwia Grzybowska, those in attendance went to the synagogue memorial stone and lit candles.

Commemorative plaque 
On January 26, 2019, a commemorative plaque with content in three languages was stolen from its stone. On March 22, 2019, a new stone tablet financed from contributions from the community of Kłodzko and former German residents was unveiled.

References

Gallery 

Synagogues completed in 1885
Buildings and structures in Lower Silesian Voivodeship
Synagogues destroyed during Kristallnacht (Germany)
Synagogue buildings with domes
Former Reform synagogues in Poland
Moorish Revival synagogues
Gothic Revival synagogues
Kłodzko County
19th-century religious buildings and structures in Poland